Ringmer Association Football Club is a football club based in Ringmer, England. They are currently members of the Mid Sussex League Premier Division and play at King's Academy, Ringmer.

History
In 2020, Ringmer A.F.C. was formed by the merger of AFC Ringmer and Ringmer, joining the Mid Sussex League. In 2022, the club was admitted into the Southern Combination Division One. In a Twitter statement dated 30 May 2022, AFC decided not to pursue promotion and remained in the Mid Sussex Football League

Ground
The club currently play at King's Academy, Ringmer.

References

Association football clubs established in 2020
2020 establishments in England
Football clubs in England
Football clubs in East Sussex
Mid-Sussex Football League
Southern Combination Football League
A.F.C.